The Lakes School is a coeducational secondary school and sixth form located in Troutbeck Bridge, Windermere, in the English county of Cumbria.

It is a comprehensive community school administered by Cumbria County Council. Its catchment area includes: Grasmere, Langdale Valley, Ambleside, Troutbeck, Windermere, Bowness on Windermere and Staveley. The school also offers evening adult education classes to the local community.

History
The Lakes School is one of the first purpose built comprehensive schools and was opened by Tony Crosland MP, Secretary of State for Education, on 8 October 1965 the same year he issued Circular 10/65 promoting comprehensive education.

The school was first thought of in 1936 and brought together three existing schools, Windermere Grammar for boys, Kelswick, Ambleside, coeducational and Old College, Windermere, for girls. Windermere Grammar School is in the Guinness Book of Records as the first ever comprehensive school formed in 1945 after the 1944 Education Act.

Notable alumni
Chris Acland - Musician, Drummer with Lush. Attended the school from 1978-1985.
Michael Cumming - Director, Filmmaker. Best known for his award winning comedy directing on Brass Eye, Toast Of London. Attended the school from 1974-1981.
 Thomas Gardner - Director, Filmmaker. Best known for his acclaimed films Route to Paradise and The Fronts of War, the latter of which won 16 international film awards. Attended the school from 2008-2015.

References

External links
The Lakes School official website

Secondary schools in Cumbria
Windermere, Cumbria
Educational institutions established in 1965
1965 establishments in England
Community schools in Cumbria